The Island of Women (Spanish: La isla de las mujeres) is a 1953 Mexican film directed by Rafael Baledón and starring Germán Valdés, Lilia del Valle and Fernando Soto. A man is stranded on a desert island which is ruled by women.

Cast 
 Germán Valdés as Tin Tan
 Lilia del Valle as Orana
 Fernando Soto as Uru uru
 Marcelo Chávez as Toronga
 Carlota Solares as Matriarca
 Pedro de Aguillón as Tacaroa
 Araceli Julián as Flora
 Elena Julián as Maroma
 Rosalía Julián as Caroa
 Joaquín García Vargas as Isleño
 Luz María Núñez as La que no tiene nombre
 Omar Jasso as Isleño
 Estela Matute as Subastadora
 Pepe Ruiz Vélez as Anunciador
 Aurora Segura as Mujer de Tacaroa
 Gregorio Acosta as Hombre de isla vecina
 Guillermo Bravo Sosa as Encargado funeraria
 Alfonso Carti as Isleño
 Manuel Casanueva as Isleño
 José Chávez as Isleño
 Juan García as Isleño
 Jesús Gómez as Isleño
 Elvira Lodi as Isleña
 Velia Lupercio as Espectadora avión
 José Ortega as Cliente de Tin Tan
 José Pardavé as Piloto
 Ángela Rodríguez as Guardia isleña
 Alta Mae Stone as Isleña

References

Bibliography 
 Baugh, Scott L. Latino American Cinema: An Encyclopedia of Movies, Stars, Concepts, and Trends: An Encyclopedia of Movies, Stars, Concepts, and Trends. ABC-CLIO, 2012.

External links 
 

1953 films
1953 comedy films
Mexican comedy films
1950s Spanish-language films
Films directed by Rafael Baledón
Mexican black-and-white films
1950s Mexican films